Piccadilly Circus is a London Underground station located directly beneath Piccadilly Circus itself, with entrances at every corner. Located in Travel-card Zone 1, the station is on the Piccadilly line between Green Park and Leicester Square and on the Bakerloo line between Charing Cross and Oxford Circus.

History
The station was opened on 10 March 1906 by the Baker Street and Waterloo Railway (now the Bakerloo line) with the platforms of the Great Northern, Piccadilly and Brompton Railway (now the Piccadilly line) being opened on 15 December 1906. As originally built it had, like other stations, a surface booking hall (designed, like many in central London built at that time, by Leslie Green). The development of traffic before and after World War I meant that the need for improved station facilities was acute – in 1907 1.5 million passengers used the station, by 1922 it had grown to 18 million passengers. It was decided to construct a sub-surface booking hall and circulating area, which would also provide public pedestrian subways. Work began in February 1925 and was completed in 1928. The architect was Charles Holden and the builder was John Mowlem & Co: the whole complex cost more than half-a-million pounds. Eleven escalators were provided in two flights, leading to the two lines serving the station. Above these escalators was once a mural by artist Stephen Bone, showing the world with London at its centre. This mural was later replaced by advertising. The famous Shaftesbury Memorial Fountain (alias Eros), directly above the station, had to be moved to Victoria Embankment Gardens while the construction work was taking place.

The old station building designed by Leslie Green finally closed for traffic on 21 July 1929, it was demolished in the 1980s when the large building on the corner of Jermyn Street, Piccadilly and Haymarket was constructed; although parts of it remain preserved in disused areas.

The Bakerloo line platforms at Piccadilly Circus offer a unique view on the network: the back to back layout is itself unusual, but the single tunnel containing a crossover at the north end of the station allows passengers to see both platforms at once. 

This station can act as an intermediate terminus for southbound Bakerloo line trains. Piccadilly Circus is one of the few London Underground stations which have no associated buildings above ground.

London Transport Museum frequently runs guided tours of the original Edwardian parts of the station through its "Hidden London" programme.

Artwork 

In 2016, Art on the Underground commissioned artists Langlands & Bell to create an artwork to commemorate Frank Pick, the former CEO of London Transport, on the 75th anniversary of his death. The artwork Beauty < Immortality is located in a prominent place on the wall of the ticket hall, with a Frank Pick tube roundel and bronze lettering in Johnston – a typeface commissioned by Pick in 1915, which is still used across the London transport network today.

Future
Piccadilly Circus is a proposed stop on the Chelsea-Hackney Line, also known as the Crossrail 2. It would be between Victoria and Tottenham Court Road stations. Effectively a new station would have to be built under the existing levels, possibly as part of a major overhaul of the existing buildings. However, there will only be a stop at Piccadilly Circus if the Chelsea-Hackney Line is part of the London Underground network and not part of the National Rail network. This is the same situation with many stations on the proposed route in Central London.

Connections
London Buses routes 6, 9, 12, 14, 19, 38, 88, 94, 139, 159, 453 and night routes N3, N9, N15, N18, N19, N38, N97, N109, N113 and N136 serve the station.

References

External links

 

 

Bakerloo line stations
Piccadilly line stations
London Underground Night Tube stations
Proposed Chelsea-Hackney Line stations
Tube stations in the City of Westminster
Former Baker Street and Waterloo Railway stations
Former Great Northern, Piccadilly and Brompton Railway stations
Railway stations in Great Britain opened in 1906
Charles Holden railway stations
Tube station
Buildings and structures in Mayfair
Grade II listed buildings in the City of Westminster
Grade II listed railway stations
Art Deco architecture in London
1906 establishments in England